Dyscrasis is a genus of picture-winged flies in the family Ulidiidae.

Species
Dyscrasis hendeli Aldrich, 1932

References

Ulidiidae
Brachycera genera
Taxa named by John Merton Aldrich
Diptera of North America